Oligoasthenozoospermia is a combination of:
 Asthenozoospermia (reduced sperm motility) and
 Oligozoospermia (low spermatozoon count)